Hootagalli or Hutagalli is a city  and a Suburb of Mysore , situated in  Mysuru metropolitan area ಮೈಸೂರು ಜಿಲ್ಲೆ of Karnataka, India. Hootagalli is located in the outskirts of the city of Mysuru and forms a continuous urban area. Hootagalli city municipal council consists of previous census towns of Hinkal, Hootagalli and Gram Panchyats of Koorgalli and Belavadi totally covering an area of  28.48 square km. In November 2020, the government of Karnataka approved the formation of Hootagalli City Municipal Council by merging four gram panchayats. The initial plan was to include it with MCC to form Greater Mysuru City Corporation (BMMP) however, due to MCC disputing the proposal, a separate body was created. According to 2011 census, the city municipal council has combined population of 56,876. On November 26, 2020, a gazetted notification was passed making the CMC official.

Infrastructure 
Hootagalli City Municipal Council is well connected to the city of Mysore through Mysore-Bantwal National Highway. It consists of the only flyover located in the urban agglomeration of Mysore. Various civic amenities like drinking water, roads and housing are taken care. Hootagalli also consists of a well planned layout by Karnataka Housing Board.

Economy 
Hootagalli Industrial Area consists of various manufacturing companies like Meritor-Kalyani Automotive Axles, Rane Madras, Reckitt Benckiser, Lunars, RPG Cables. It also consists of various IT companies like Infosys, Wipro Infotech, L&T Infotech, Excelsoft etc. In 2011 census year, the city generate revenue of 12 crores.

Education and Healthcare 

Hootagalli City Municipal Council consists of various schools like  East West International, Pushkarni, Excel Public School etc. It also has connectivity to various education institutes present in and around the city of Mysuru. NIE Institute of Technology engineering college is located in Hootagalli Industrial Area.

Various Institutes are:

 NIE Institute of Technology 
 East West International 
 Pushkarni
 Excel Public School
 Notre Dame School
 Daksha PU College
 Rotary Midtown
 Govt Women’s First Grade College

Various Hospitals in and around Hootagalli are

 Pralaksha Hospital
 Supriya Hospital 
 Annapurna Eye Hospital

It also well connected to Hospitals like

 BM Hospital
 Columbia Asia 
 Chandrakala Hospital
 Brindavan Hospital 
Jayadeva hospital

Retail 

The stretch from Vijaynagar to Hinkal along Mysuru-Bantwal Road consists of various automotive showrooms like Royal Enfield, Kia, Nissan,Benelli etc. Reliance Market is the largest hyper market in the city. The area is also home to hotels and resorts such as Silent Shores, Ruchi the Prince, Mysore Socials etc. Nearest Mall is BM Habitat Mall.

Transport 
It is well connected with Mysore city buses with many buses available from City Bus Stand.KSRTC buses going towards Madikeri or Hassan will also stop. The nearest railway station is Belagola which is 7 km away but only slow trains stop. The nearest big station where is Mysore Junction railway station which is 9 km from the town. The Nearest airport is Mysore Airport and nearest international airport is Kempegowda International Airport, Bangalore.

Major Roads that pass through or originate at Hootagalli are

 NH275 Mysuru-Mangalore Road, Flyover at Ring Road Junction
 KRS Road via BEML
 Infosys Road
 RPG Cables Road
 KHB Colony Main Road
 Outer Ring Road

Localities

Residential 

 Hootagalli 
 KHB Colony
 Hinkal
 Koorgalli
 Belavadi
 Vijayanagar 4th Stage (Part of the layout)
 SRS Colony
 Vinayaka Enclave

Industrial Areas 

 Hootagalli Industrial Area
 Hebbal Industrial Area
 Koorgalli Industrial Area
Belavadi Industrial Area

Landmarks 

 Foundation Silver Springs
 Yashaswi Convention Hall
 Saraswathi Convention Hall
 Infosys Mysore
 CESC Receiving Station
 Infant Jesus Church
 MUDA Park
 Sowparnika Royal Splendor

Demographics
According to the 2011 Indian Census, Hutagalli census town consisted of 18,308 people, Belavadi village consisted of 6,995 people, Hinkal census town consisted of 23,162 people, Koorgalli census town consisted of 7,065 people. Population of the area grew from 31,991 in 2001 to 56,876 in 2011. The projected population of the proposed city municipal council using the growth rate of each constituent town or village is 105,982 in 2020. The density of population is 1,996 people per square kilometer. 99% of the population indulge in non agricultural activities.

2001-31,991.

2011-56,876.

Gallery

References

Cities and towns in Mysore district
Suburbs of Mysore